The Indian women's national under-17 football team represents India in international women's under-17 football. The team is controlled by the governing body for football in India, the All India Football Federation (AIFF). The federation is currently a member of the Asian Football Confederation (AFC) and the regional South Asian Football Federation (SAFF).

The team have only participated once in the AFC U-17 Women's Championship, back during the tournament's inaugural edition.

History

FIFA U-17 Women's World Cup
FIFA first organised the U-17 Women's World Cup in the year 2008 and has since organised it on every even years. From Asia, the top three teams from AFC U-16 Women's Championship get qualified for the world cup, but India failed to qualify any of AFC championships since 2007 edition to 2017, thus failed to qualify for the first six editions of the World Cup.

India is selected as the host of the 2022 FIFA U-17 Women's World Cup and thus automatically got qualified for the tournament. It is supposed to be their first participation in the World Cup, but their participation was under threat after the All India Football Federation was suspended by FIFA and the hosting rights for the tournament were stripped from India. However, the AIFF was later reinstated by FIFA and the tournament rights were given back to India, confirming their participation for the tournament.

AFC U-17 Women's Asian Cup
India women's U17 team first played their international match at the inaugural edition of AFC U-16 Women's Championship in 2005 where they first faced Thailand and got defeated by 6−4 on 16 April 2005. In the second match South Korea defeated them again by 7−0, but in the third match India registered their first win defeating Indonesia by 6−0 but they failed to proceed beyond the group stage. This was India's only AFC Women's U16 Championship campaign, as they failed to qualify any of the championships held since, which is being organised by AFC on every odd years.

SAFF U-15 Women's Championship
SAFF U15 Women's championship was first organised in 2017, where India became runners-up after being defeated by Bangladesh by a solitary goal. In the next edition in 2018, the final was repeated again, but this time India beat Bangladesh by a solitary goal and become the SAFF champion. In the 2019 SAFF U-15 Women's Championship, India and Bangladesh reached the final for the third time. Both the teams failed to score any goals  within the regulation time. Thus penalty shoot-out became the match decider where Bangladesh failed to convert the first spot kick, which resulted in India becoming the champion by a 5−3 result in the shoot-out.

BRICS U-17 Football Cup
In 2018, at the second edition of BRICS U-17 Football Cup, which is a U-17 Football tournament played among teams of five BRICS countries, the U17 women's teams of the respective countries were invited to play in the tournament. India played round robin matches, first against South Africa, and suffered a loss by 5−1, then suffered another defeat against Russia by 3−1. In their next match Brazil defeated them by 5−0 and in their last match they lost 2−1 to China.

Results and fixtures
Legend

2022

2023

Coaching staff

Current coaching staff

Players

U16 squad
 The following 20 players were called up for 2023 SAFF U-17 Women's Championship.

Competitive record

FIFA U-17 Women's World Cup

 Red border indicates the team played as the host of the tournament.

AFC U-17 Women's Asian Cup

SAFF U-15/U-17 Women's Championship

See also
Sport in India
Football in India
Women's football in India
India women's national football team
India women's national under-20 football team
India men's national football team
Indian Women's League

References

External links
India women's national under-17 football team – official website 

Asian women's national under-17 association football teams
u17
Football
Youth football in India